A degradative enzyme is an enzyme (in a broader sense a protein) which degrades biological molecules. Some examples of degradative enzymes:
Lipase, which digests lipids,
Carbohydrases, which digest carbohydrates (e.g., sugars),
Proteases, which digest proteins,
Nucleases, which digest nucleic acids.
Cathelicidins, antimicrobial polypeptides found in lysosomes.

References

See also
 Hydrolase

Enzymes